Komla is a given name. Notable people with the name include:

Komla Dumor (1972–2014), Ghanaian journalist
Komla Agbeli Gbedemah (1913–1998), Ghanaian politician

See also

Kamla (name), given name and surname
Komala § People with the name Komala